The R361 road is a regional road mainly in County Roscommon, Ireland. South to north the route connects Williamstown to Boyle. 

See also
Roads in Ireland
National primary road
National secondary road

References
Roads Act 1993 (Classification of Regional Roads) Order 2006 – Department of Transport

Regional roads in the Republic of Ireland
Roads in County Roscommon